Teukrus is a genus of beetles in the family Carabidae, containing the following species:

 Teukrus bifasciatus (Bates, 1871)
 Teukrus cruciatus (Bates, 1871)

References

Ctenodactylinae